Automatic is a rock band from Los Angeles. Automatic’s members are Izzy Glaudini (synths, vocals), Halle Saxon (bass, vocals), and Lola Dompé (drums, vocals).

Biography
The three band members met while immersed in L.A.’s DIY music scene and started playing live in 2017, taking their name from the track "Automatic" from The Go-Go's album Beauty and the Beat. The group signed to Los Angeles label Stones Throw in June 2019.

Dompé  is the daughter of Bauhaus drummer Kevin Haskins and joined her first band, art-rock outfit Blackblack, when she was 13.

Automatic announced their debut album Signal with the release of their first single "Calling It" on 3 June 2019. The band put out two more singles, a cover of Delta 5's "Mind Your Own Business" and title track "Signal", before releasing the album on 27 September 2019. Pitchfork described Signal as "an exercise in post-punk and no-wave galvanism". The band released Signal Remixes on 26 March 2021, which included reworks from artists such as Peanut Butter Wolf, Sudan Archives, Peaking Lights, Osees' John Dwyer and Bauhaus' Kevin Haskins.

On 8 March 2022, Automatic announced their new album Excess with their first single "New Beginning". Stereogum described "New Beginning" as "’60s pop kitsch". The group followed it up with their second single "Venus Hour" on 7 April 2022. Excess was released on 24 June 2022 on Stones Throw.

Discography

Albums

Singles

References

Rock music groups from California